Hurricane Emilia was, at the time, the strongest tropical cyclone on record in the Central Pacific Ocean, and the second of such to be classified as a Category 5 hurricane – the highest rating on the Saffir–Simpson hurricane wind scale. However, hurricanes Gilma later that year, Ioke in 2006, and hurricanes Lane and Walaka in 2018 later reached lower barometric pressures in the Central Pacific. In addition, Emilia was the first Category 5 Pacific hurricane since Hurricane Ava in 1973. The fifth named storm and the first of three Category 5 hurricanes of the 1994 hurricane season, Emilia developed from an area of low pressure southeast of Hawaii on July 16. Tracking westward, the initial tropical depression intensified into a tropical storm several hours after tropical cyclogenesis. Subsequently, Emilia entered the Central Pacific Ocean and moved into the area of responsibility of the Central Pacific Hurricane Center (CPHC).

After slight oscillations in strength, an upper-level trough forced the intense hurricane northwest on July 21, and Emilia began to weaken thereafter. The tropical cyclone encountered an area of vertical wind shear and cool sea surface temperatures, which further weakened the system. The following day, Emilia made its closest approach to the Big Island of Hawaii, but subsequently weakened to below hurricane intensity. This weakening trend continued, and the tropical cyclone fully dissipated on July 25. Though the hurricane did not make landfall, Emilia brought strong surf to the islands of Hawaii and caused gusty winds, which resulted in some property damage. Precipitation was also reported, but remained under moderate levels.

Meteorological history 

On June 29, a weak tropical wave exited the west African coast and traversed the Atlantic, showing no signs of organization or convective activity. A low-level circulation became evident, and the system was designated as a tropical depression on July 16. Within 12 hours, satellite imagery suggested that the system had intensified into Tropical Storm Emilia with  sustained winds. Emilia steadily intensified into a minimal hurricane by the next morning, as it moved west-northwest. At 18:00 UTC, Emilia was upgraded to Category 2 status as it crossed 140°W and entered the Central Pacific Hurricane Center's (CPHC) area of responsibility, which noted that Emilia was "well developed."

On July 20, Emilia briefly weakened into a Category 4 hurricane, but it was re-upgraded to Category 5 status by the CPHC 12 hours later during the day. Subsequently, Emilia began to weaken for the final time. An upper-level trough in the westerlies caused the cyclone to turn northwest on July 21. Emilia moved over progressively cooler waters, and vertical wind shear from the westerlies negatively impacted the hurricane. On July 22, Emilia continued to weaken, and it passed within  of the Big Island. It was the closest approach to the islands. Emilia gradually turned west-northwest, and the circulation moved with the trade winds. Emilia weakened into a tropical depression on July 24, and a remnant swirl of stratocumulus clouds was noted. The system dissipated on the same day.

Preparations 
Initially, forecasts significantly underestimated the intensification of Emilia, which was one of three tropical cyclones to attain Category 5 status in the central Pacific during the season. On July 16, a 72-hour forecast misjudged the strengthening of Emilia by 41 m/s (92 mph). Later, winds at 72 hours were 31 m/s (69 mph) too high when the cyclone began to weaken. Tropical cyclone forecast models consistently predicted Emilia to remain south of the Hawaiian Islands because of the upper troughs' climatologically weak nature during the summer. This led to high confidence in the forecasts, resulting in a lack of watches or warnings. Nonetheless, a high surf advisory was issued for the south and east coasts of all islands.

Impact and records 

Surf was lower along the Kona and Kohala coasts. Winds were gusty, causing a few trees to be blown over and branches to be broken. Some minor roof damage was caused by the winds. International observatories and the Keck Telescope on the top of Mauna Kea were forced to close their domes due to the high winds. Rainfall ranged from light to moderate. The storm passed near two National Oceanic and Atmospheric Administration (NOAA) weather buoys during its passage through the state. All in all, Hurricane Emilia had mostly minor effects in the Hawaiian Islands.

Emilia is one of the most intense tropical cyclones on record in the Eastern Pacific, with a minimum pressure of 926 mbar (hPa; 27.34 inHg). In the CPHC warning zone, only Gilma, Ioke of 2006, and hurricanes Lane and Walaka of 2018 attained deeper pressures. Emilia was also a Category 5 hurricane for 18 hours, the most ever at the time in the Central Pacific. That record was broken later in the season by Hurricane John.

The storm was the subject of a disagreement between the Central Pacific Hurricane Center and the National Hurricane Center. Specifically, they debated Emilia's peak strength in relation to the Saffir-Simpson hurricane scale (SSHWS). During 2008, the NHC upgraded its "best track" to make Emilia a Category 5, although there continues to be a discrepancy in Emilia's duration at Category 5 intensity. The CPHC's data deems Emilia as having regained Category 5 status at 18:00 UTC July 20 and maintaining it for 12 hours, while the NHC's data places Emilia as having maintained Category 4-strength winds of  during this period.

See also 

Other storms of the same name
Hurricane Ignacio (1985)
Hurricane Gilma (1994)
List of Hawaii hurricanes
Pacific hurricane
List of tropical cyclones

Notes

References 

1994 Pacific hurricane season
Category 5 Pacific hurricanes
Hurricanes in Hawaii
1994 in Hawaii